Hermon Griswold Batterson (May 28, 1827 – March 9, 1903) was born in Marbledale, Connecticut. He was ordained to the diaconate on November 17, 1861 by Alexander Gregg and to the priesthood on December 19, 1865 by Henry Benjamin Whipple. Batterson became rector of Saint Clement's Church, Philadelphia in 1869, and served in that capacity until 1872. He was subsequently rector of the Church of the Annunciation, also in Philadelphia, from 1872 to 1888. He served as rector of the Church of the Redeemer, New York City, from 1891 until his retirement.

His widow donated the building of Christ Church Cathedral, Salina, Kansas in his memory.

Batterson's Sketch-book of the American Episcopate (1878, 1884) is a standard biographical work for American Anglican church history.

Bibliography
 The missionary tune book: adapted to the Book of Common Prayer (1868)
 Christmas carols and other verses (1877)
 A sketch-book of the American episcopate (1878)
 Vesper Bells and Other Verses (1896)
 The Pathway of Faith: A Manual of Instructions and Prayers for the Use of those who desire to serve God in the station of life in which He has placed them (1897)

References
 New York Times obituary, March 12, 1903
 Obituary notice in The Living Church from Project Canterbury
 The Living Church Annual 1904, p. 50

1827 births
1903 deaths
19th-century American Episcopal priests
American Anglo-Catholics
People from Washington, Connecticut
Anglo-Catholic clergy
Anglo-Catholic writers